Simon the Sinner (Swedish: Simon syndaren) is a 1954 Swedish drama film directed by Gunnar Hellström and starring Hellström, Ann-Marie Gyllenspetz and Stig Järrel. It was shot at the Stocksund Studios  in Stockholm and on location around the city.

Synopsis
Believing that he has killed a man in a fight, Simon goes to take shelter with a religious group.

Cast
 Gunnar Hellström as Simon Angus
 Ann-Marie Gyllenspetz as	Rut Persson
 Stig Järrel as Reverend Rickman
 Einar Axelsson as 	Persson
 Åke Grönberg as Lund
 Marianne Löfgren as 	Mrs. Spalding
 Sven-Eric Gamble as 	Herbert
 Willy Peters as 	Journalist
 Ulla Sjöblom as 	Sick Girl
 Carl Ström as 	Mattsson
 Märta Dorff as 	Simon's Mother
 Olof Sandborg as 	Deaf Rock Blaster
 Olle Hilding as Believer
 Märta Arbin as 	Believer's Wife
 David Erikson as	Member of Elder's Council
 Nils Ohlin as 	Member of Elder's Council
 Renée Björling as 	Woman Drinking Coffee
 Magnus Kesster as 	Editor
 Hans Sandberg as 	Biker
 Anders Andelius as 	Biker
 Siv Ericks as 	Woman Drinking Coffee 
 Gösta Prüzelius as 	Policeman
 Jane Friedmann as	Telephone Operator
 John Melin as 	Relief Seeker
 Carl-Axel Hallgren as 	Kantor
 Margit Andelius as Store Clerk 
 Olga Appellöf as 	Mother seeking help 
 Astrid Bodin as Woman in Square 
 Arthur Fischer as Man with cigar 
 Siegfried Fischer as 	Older Worker 
 Svea Holst as 	Mrs. Spalding's Maid 
 Axel Högel as 	Man standing in line 
 Stig Johanson as 	Man in Square 
 Sten Mattsson as 	Biker 
 Georg Skarstedt as 	Older Worker 
 Hugo Tranberg as 	Man with walking stick 
 Måns Westfelt as 	Man with beret

References

Bibliography 
 Qvist, Per Olov & von Bagh, Peter. Guide to the Cinema of Sweden and Finland. Greenwood Publishing Group, 2000.
 Wright, Rochelle. The Visible Wall: Jews and Other Ethnic Outsiders in Swedish Film. SIU Press, 1998.

External links 
 

1954 films
Swedish drama films
1954 drama films
1950s Swedish-language films
Films directed by Gunnar Hellström
Films shot in Stockholm
1950s Swedish films